Ficus thonningii is a species of Ficus.  It is native to Africa. It is commonly known as Mugumo to the Agikuyu or the Strangler Fig in common English.  Recent phylogenetic analysis suggests it may be a species complex.

The species has diverse economic and environmental uses across many faming and pastoral communities in Africa. In some dryland areas in Africa for example, it is a very good source of dry season livestock fodder, because it produces highly nutritious foliage in large amounts all year round. Parts of the plant edible for livestock include, leaves, twigs and barks, and their nutirional value varies with season

Religious significance
The Ficus thonningii tree is widely regarded as a holy tree among the Agikuyu and Mount Kenyan tribes. When praying for rain, an elder performs a sacrifice to Ngai (God) by fanning the smoke of a roasted, fattened lamb up the tree (Mugumo), inviting Ngai (God) to descend from above the clouds for the feast.

Ficus thonningii is often confused with its cousin Ficus natalensis, which tends to have leaves that are wider above the middle tapering to the bottom. Ficus natalensis is mainly found in Western Kenya and the coast as opposed to Ficus thonningii, which is common in the Mount Kenya region.

So revered is the Mugumo tree in the Mount Kenya region that, in 2020, the President of Kenya issued a decree protecting a Ficus thonningii from being uprooted during the construction of the Nairobi Expressway. The particular tree was nicknamed the Waiyaki Way fig tree.

References

External links

USDA PLANTS database profile.
Figweb Ficus thonningii

thonningii
Trees of Angola
Trees of Kenya
Trees in religion